The 1913 Montana football team represented the University of Montana in the 1913 college football season. They were led by first-year head coach A. George Heilman, played their home games at Dornblaser Field and finished the season with a record of two wins and four losses (2–4). Montana did not play Idaho this season.

Schedule

References

Montana
Montana Grizzlies football seasons
Montana football